Dikraneurini is a leafhopper tribe in the subfamily Typhlocybinae.

Genera 

 Afrakeura
 Afrakra
 Alconeura
 Anaka
 Aneono
 Aroonra
 Aruena
 Ayubiana
 Britimnathista
 Buritia
 Cuanta
 Dicraneurula
 Dikraneura
 Dikrella
 Dikrellidia
 Donidea
 Dziwneono
 Emelyanoviana
 Endoxoneura
 Erythria
 Flatseta
 Forcipata
 Fusiplata
 Golwala
 Gullifera
 Hazaraneura
 Hybla
 Idona
 Igutettix
 Iniesta
 Jimara
 Kahaono
 Kalkiana
 Kamaza
 Karachiota
 Kerygma
 Kidraneuroidea
 Kidrella
 Kirkaldykra
 Kunzeana
 Kunzella
 Liguropia

 Micantulina
 Michalowskiya
 Motschulskyia
 Naratettix
 Neodikrella
 Notus
 Parallaxis
 Platfusa
 Ramsisia
 Riyavaroa
 Saranella
 Sarascarta
 Smita
 Sweta
 Takagioma
 Togaricrania
 Typhlocybella
 Urvana
 Uzeldikra
 Vikabara
 Wagneriala
 Youngszella
 Zielona

References 

 
Typhlocybinae
Hemiptera tribes